Ceriops tagal, commonly known as spurred mangrove or Indian mangrove, is a mangrove tree species in the family Rhizophoraceae. It is a protected tree in South Africa. The specific epithet  is a plant name from the Tagalog language.

Description
The growth habit is columnar or multi-stemmed and the tree develops large buttress roots. The radiating anchor roots are sometimes exposed and may loop up in places. The bark is silvery-grey to orangeish-brown, smooth with occasional pustular lenticels. The flowers are borne singly in the leaf axils; each has a long stalk and a short calyx tube, and parts in fives or sixes. The paired stamens are enclosed in the petals which open explosively when disturbed. Brown at first, they change colour as they mature and the hypocotyl emerges.

Distribution and habitat
Ceriops tagal grows naturally in eastern and southern Africa, Madagascar, Seychelles, India, Maldives, China, Indo-China, Malesia, Papuasia, the Caroline Islands, New Caledonia and Australia. Its habitat is in brackish water areas in tidal zones.

Uses
The durable wood is used in house construction. It is also used in the manufacture of charcoal, and is favoured as firewood, being second only to Rhizophora spp., and a dye can be extracted from the bark. Among the mangrove species, its bark and sap yield red and black dyes which are used in batik and tanning leather.

In the Philippines, the extracts (barok) from the dried bark (marka tungog or tangal) are used as bittering and fermenting agents for the traditional bahalina palm wines, giving them a deep brown-orange color and a bitter tangy aftertaste. It is also used to tan and dye leather.

Gallery

See also
List of Southern African indigenous trees

References

External links

Rhizophoraceae
Mangroves
Trees of Africa
Trees of China
Flora of tropical Asia
Trees of Australia
Flora of the Caroline Islands
Trees of New Caledonia
Protected trees of South Africa
Plants described in 1908
Western Indo-Pacific flora
Central Indo-Pacific flora